Edward Muhima  (born 14 June 1946) is an Anglican bishop in Uganda: he was Bishop of North Kigezi from 2004 to 2011.

Muhira was born in Bunyaruguru, Rubirizi District. He was educated at Nyakinoni Primary School, Nyakasura Secondary School and Uganda Christian University. He was a teacher before his call to ministry.

References

1946 births
Anglican bishops of North Kigezi
21st-century Anglican bishops in Uganda
People from Rubirizi District
Uganda Christian University alumni
Ugandan educators
Living people